Deconica horizontalis is a species of agaric fungus in the family Strophariaceae.

Fungi described in 1788
Strophariaceae
Taxa named by Jean Baptiste François Pierre Bulliard